From Safer Place is the debut studio album by British band Fawn Spots. It was released in March 2015 under Critical Heights.

Track list

Notes

References

2015 debut albums
Fawn Spots albums